Michael "Misha" Kolganov (or Kalganov, ; born 24 October 1974) is a USSR-born Israeli sprint kayaker and former two-time world champion (1998 & 1999). Competing in three Summer Olympics, he won the bronze medal in the K-1 500 m event at Sydney in 2000. He was the flag bearer for Israel during the 2008 Summer Olympics opening ceremony.

Early life
Mikhail Kolganov was born in Tashkent, Uzbek SSR, Soviet Union. He is Jewish. and took up canoeing at the age of 14.  "I was a fat young boy," he recalled, "and my parents were looking for a hobby for me that would help me lose weight." Kolganov's older brother Andrei also represented the Soviet Union, and was a Soviet youth champion at kayak competition. Kolganov immigrated to Israel in 1995.

Carear
Kolganov has represented Israel in competition since 1997. Kolganov was K-1 200 m world champion in 1998 and 1999, and earned a K-1 500 m silver in 1998.

He represented Israel at the 2000 Summer Olympics, winning the K-1 500 m bronze medal and finishing fourth in the K-1 1000 m event. He competed on behalf of Israel at the 2004 Summer Olympics, and finished eighth in the second semifinal of the K-1 500 m. He competed on behalf of Israel at the 2008 Summer Olympics in Beijing, China, and failed to advance to the final in both the K-1 500 m and K-1 1000 m events.

He has also competed in the K-2. where at the 2006 European Championships in Račice, Czech Republic, he won the K2 200 m bronze medal with partner Barak Lufan.  At the 2006 ICF Canoe Sprint World Championships in Szeged, Hungary, Kolganov and Lufan finished fifth in the K-2 200 m and sixth in the K-2 500 m.

Kolganov served in the Israel Defense Forces.

See also
 List of select Jewish canoeists

References

External links
 
 
 
 

1974 births
Living people
Canoeists at the 2000 Summer Olympics
Canoeists at the 2004 Summer Olympics
Canoeists at the 2008 Summer Olympics
Israeli male canoeists
Israeli people of Uzbekistani-Jewish descent
Jewish Israeli sportspeople
Olympic canoeists of Israel
Olympic bronze medalists for Israel
Soviet male canoeists
Uzbekistani male canoeists
Uzbekistani emigrants to Israel
Sportspeople from Tashkent
Soviet emigrants to Israel
Olympic medalists in canoeing
ICF Canoe Sprint World Championships medalists in kayak
Medalists at the 2000 Summer Olympics